Miguel Santos Ruiz (born 4 October 1999) is a Spanish chess player. He was awarded the title of Grandmaster (GM) by FIDE in 2019.

He played in the chess World Cup 2019, where he was defeated by Wei Yi in the first round.

References

External links 
 
 Miguel Santos Ruiz chess games at 365Chess.com
 

1999 births
Living people
Chess grandmasters
Spanish chess players